Carolyn Graham is the creator of numerous English-language teaching books, most notably Jazz Chants and Let's Sing, Let's Chant, published by Oxford University Press. She also wrote the songs for the Let's Go (textbooks) and Susan Rivers' Tiny Talk series of ELT books, also published by OUP.

Jazz Chants
Throughout the 1980s and 1990s Graham's Jazz Chants became popular along with the ESL teaching methods and techniques during the same period. Graham developed the technique of jazz chanting during her 25 years of teaching ESL in the American Language Institute of New York University. She has also taught at Harvard University and has conducted workshops in the NYU School of Education, Columbia Teachers College in New York and Tokyo, and elsewhere throughout the world.

Bibliography
Graham is the author of numerous Jazz Chants books, mostly published by Oxford University Press.

References

External links
Oxford University Press

American textbook writers
Women textbook writers
Living people
Year of birth missing (living people)
New York University faculty
Harvard University faculty
Columbia University faculty